Antioch Christian Church may refer to:

 Antioch International Movement of Churches
 Antioch Christian Church (Winchester, Kentucky), see National Register of Historic Places listings in Clark County, Kentucky
 Antioch Christian Church (Kansas City, Missouri), see National Register of Historic Places listings in Missouri, Counties C
 Antioch Christian Church (Allendale, South Carolina), see National Register of Historic Places listings in South Carolina